Diego de Zambrana (also Diego de Zambrana y Guzmán or Diego de Carmona) (died 1609) was a Roman Catholic prelate who was Archbishop Elect of La Plata o Charcas (1608–1609) and Bishop Elect of La Paz (1605–1608).

Biography
On 4 July 1605, Diego de Zambrana was appointed during the papacy of Pope Paul V as the first Bishop of La Paz but never arrived to take possession. On 14 January 1608, he was instead appointed during the papacy of Pope Paul V as Archbishop of La Plata o Charcas. He died soon after in 1609 before he was consecrated.

References

External links and additional sources
 (for Chronology of Bishops) 
 (for Chronology of Bishops) 
 (for Chronology of Bishops) 
 (for Chronology of Bishops) 

17th-century Roman Catholic bishops in Bolivia
Bishops appointed by Pope Gregory XIII
1609 deaths
Roman Catholic bishops of Sucre
Roman Catholic bishops of La Paz